Foreign accent syndrome is a medical condition in which patients develop speech patterns that are perceived as a foreign accent that is different from their native accent, without having acquired it in the perceived accent's place of origin.

Foreign accent syndrome usually results from a stroke, but can also develop from head trauma, migraines or developmental problems. The condition might occur due to lesions in the speech production network of the brain, or may also be considered a neuropsychiatric condition. The condition was first reported in 1907, and between 1941 and 2009 there were 62 recorded cases.

Its symptoms result from distorted articulatory planning and coordination processes, and although popular news articles commonly attempt to identify the closest regional accent, speakers with foreign accent syndrome acquire neither a specific foreign accent nor any additional fluency in a foreign language. There has been no verified case where a patient's foreign language skills have improved after a brain injury.

Signs and symptoms 
To the untrained ear, those with the syndrome sound as though they speak their native languages with a foreign accent; for example, an American native speaker of English might sound as though they spoke with a south-eastern English accent, or a native English speaker from Britain might speak with a New York American accent. However, researchers at Oxford University have found that certain specific parts of the brain were injured in some foreign accent syndrome cases, indicating that particular parts of the brain control various linguistic functions, and damage could result in altered pitch and/or mispronounced syllables, causing speech patterns to be distorted in a non-specific manner. Contrary to popular belief, individuals with FAS do not exhibit their accent without any effort. Instead, these individuals feel as if they have a speech disorder. More recently, there is mounting evidence that the cerebellum, which controls motor function, may be crucially involved in some cases of foreign accent syndrome, reinforcing the notion that speech pattern alteration is mechanical, and thus non-specific.

Generally, FAS is not a persisting disorder; it is a temporary stage in recovery from stroke or trauma, or potentially a stage of deterioration. FAS mainly affects speech at a segmental or prosodic level. Vowels are more likely to be affected than consonants. Vowel errors include an increase in vowel tensing, monophthongization of diphthongs, and vowel fronting and raising. There is evidence of both vowel shortening and lengthening. Consonantal anomalies include cases of changes in articulation, manner, and voicing. On a suprasegmental level, there are changes in intonation and pitch, such as monotonous intonation or exaggerations in pitch height and range. There are also difficulties in using stress accents to indicate pragmatics and meaning. There is a tendency for FAS patients to switch to syllable-timed prosody when their native language is stress-timed. This perception could be due to changes in syllable durations, and the addition of epenthetic vowels.

FAS has many similarities to apraxia of speech (AoS), which is another motor speech disorder. Some researchers think that FAS is a mild form of AoS because they are both caused by similar lesions in the brain. However, FAS differs from AoS in that FAS patients have more control over their speech deficits and their “foreign accent” is a form of compensation for their speech problems. Because there are relatively few differences in the symptoms of FAS and AoS, a listener'a perception of the affected speech plays a large role in diagnosis of FAS rather than AoS. The listener has to be familiar with a foreign accent in order to attribute it to the affected speech of someone with FAS.

The perception of a foreign accent is likely to be a case of pareidolia on the part of the listener. Nick Miller, Professor of Motor Speech Disorders at Newcastle University has explained: "The notion that sufferers speak in a foreign language is something that is in the ear of the listener, rather than the mouth of the speaker. It is simply that the rhythm and pronunciation of speech has changed."

Causes and diagnosis  
Foreign accent syndrome is more commonly pronounced in females than it is in males. In a meta-analysis of 112 patients with FAS, 97% were adults, and 67% were female. The typical age range for this disease is around 25–49 years of age. Only in 12.5% of the cases did the patients have previous exposure to the accent that they later seemed to developed due to FAS.

The majority of FAS patients develop FAS due to a stroke, but it can also develop as a result of developmental or psychological disorders, trauma, or tumors. Of the patients with neurological damage, the majority had a lesion in the supratentorial left hemisphere. Lesions primarily affected the premotor cortex, motor cortex, basal ganglia or Broca's area. Lesions are also seen in the cerebellum, which projects to the previous areas. Right hemisphere damage rarely causes FAS. The majority of patients with FAS usually present other speech disorders, such as mutism, aphasia, dysarthria, agrammatism, and apraxia of speech.

H. Whitaker first coined the term Foreign Accent Syndrome in 1982. He originally proposed some criteria that must be present in order to diagnose someone with FAS; they must be monolingual, they must have damage to their central nervous system that affects their speech, and their speech must be perceived as subjectively sounding foreign by themselves or clinicians. One problem with Whitaker's criteria is that they are based primarily on subjectivity, and therefore acoustic phonetic measurements are rarely used to diagnose FAS.

Since this syndrome is very rare, it takes a multidisciplinary team to evaluate the syndrome and diagnose it, including speech-language pathologists, neurolinguists, neurologists, neuropsychologists, and psychologists. In 2010, Verhoeven and Mariën identified several subtypes of Foreign Accent Syndrome. They described a neurogenic, developmental, psychogenic and mixed variant. Neurogenic FAS is the term used when FAS occurs after central nervous system damage. Developmental FAS is used when the accent is perceptible as of an early age, e.g. children who have always spoken with an accent. Psychogenic FAS is used when FAS is psychologically induced, associated with psychiatric disorder or clear psychiatric traits. The term mixed FAS is used when patients develop the disorder after neurological damage, but the accent change has such a profound impact on the self-perception and identity that they will modify or enhance the accent to make it fit with the new persona.

Diagnosis, up until today, is generally purely perceptually based. However, in order to find out what subtype the patient has, complementary investigations are necessary. This differentiation is necessary for the clinician to allow for correct therapeutic guidance.  Psychological evaluations may be performed in order to rule out any psychiatric condition that may be causing the change in speech, as well as tests to assess reading, writing, and language comprehension in order to identify comorbid disorders. One of the symptoms of this syndrome is that the patient moves their tongue or jaw differently while speaking, which creates a different sound, so a recording of the speech pattern is done in order to analyze it. Often, images of the brain are taken with MRI, CT, SPECT or PET scans. This is done to see if there is structural and or functional damage in the areas of the brain that control speech and/or rhythm and melody of speech. Electroencephalography is sometimes performed to investigate whether there are disturbances at the electrophysiological level.

Treatment involves intense speech therapy. Methods such as oromotor exercises, using mirrors, targeting phonetic awareness, reading lists and texts, and using electropalatography are all methods that have been used in the past. Treatment should be developed on a patient by patient basis. About a quarter of FAS patients go through remission after treatment.

History
The condition was first described in 1907 by the French neurologist Pierre Marie, and another early case was reported in a Czech study in 1919, conducted by German internist  (1859–1945). Other well-known cases of the syndrome include one that occurred in Norway in 1941 after a young woman, Astrid L., suffered a head injury from shrapnel during an air-raid. After apparently recovering from the injury, she was left with what sounded like a strong German accent and was shunned by her fellow Norwegians.

Society and culture 
Cases of foreign accent syndrome often receive significant media coverage, and cases have been reported in the popular media as resulting from various causes including stroke, allergic reaction, physical injury, and migraine. A woman with foreign accent syndrome was featured on both Inside Edition and Discovery Health Channel's Mystery ER in October 2008, and in September 2013 the BBC published an hour-long documentary about Sarah Colwill, a woman from Devon, whose "Chinese" foreign accent syndrome resulted from a severe migraine. In 2016, a Texas woman, Lisa Alamia, was diagnosed with Foreign Accent Syndrome when, following a jaw surgery, she developed what sounded like a British accent. Ellen Spencer, a woman from Indiana who has foreign accent syndrome, was interviewed on the American public radio show Snap Judgment.

In season 2 episode 12 of the American television series Hart of Dixie, one storyline revolves around character Annabeth Nass and a man she's attracted to named Oliver who has foreign accent syndrome.

The British singer George Michael said that, after waking from a three-week long coma in 2012, he temporarily had a West Country accent.

Potential treatments 
FAS is a very rare disorder. Likewise, there are not very many proposed treatments. Two that may provide relief to patients with FAS in the future include mastery of musical skills and “tongue reading”.

In terms of mastery of music skills, research by Christiner and Reiterer suggests that musicians, both instrumental and vocal, are better at imitating foreign accents than non-musicians. Vocalists are further better than instrumentalists at this task. In this way, individuals with FAS might be able to reimitate their original, lost native accents more easily if they master a musical - especially vocal – skill.

Pursuing this further, another set of researchers, Banks et al. investigated the role of hearing a foreign accent versus hearing and seeing someone use a foreign accent and which of these may be better for helping an individual replicate a foreign accent. Contrary to the researcher's predictions, “no differences were found in perceptual gains between the two modalities.” By contrast, a method that did seem to improve learning of non-native speech sounds was “real-time visual feedback of tongue movements with an interactive 3D visualization system based on electromagnetic articulography.”

Cases 
Table #1: Cases from developmental FAS (DFAS), Psychogenic FAS (PFAS) and a New Variant of Neurologic FAS

See also 
 Susac's syndrome
 Xenoglossia

References

Further reading 
 Dankovičová J, Gurd JM, Marshall JC, MacMahon MKC, Stuart-Smith J, Coleman JS, Slater A. Aspects of non-native pronunciation in a case of altered accent following stroke (foreign accent syndrome). Clinical Linguistics and Phonetics 2001;15:195-218.

External links 

 Article from New Zealand 13 July 2010
 "Stroke gives man Italian accent" at BBC Radio 4 Home Truths, 4 November 2005
 "I woke up with a foreign accent" at ABC News
 Journal of Neurolinguistics, Volume 19, Issue 5. Special issue on foreign accent syndrome.
 "Foreign Accent Syndrome Support" – site created by researchers at University of Texas at Dallas
 "Health Sentinel: Connecting symptoms finally leads to disorder diagnosis" – article from Fort Wayne, IN describing a woman's struggles with rare conditions, including Foreign Accent Syndrome. 6 December 2010
  "Woman Goes to Bed with Migraine, Wakes Up with European Accent" – article from Wabash, IN The Paper 24 July 2013.

Aphasias
Neurological disorders
Voice disorders